The Roman bridge of Salamanca (in Spanish: Puente romano de Salamanca), also known as  Puente Mayor del Tormes is a Roman bridge crossing the Tormes River on the banks of the city of Salamanca, in Castile and León, Spain. The importance of the bridge as a symbol of the city can be seen in the first quartering of city's coat of arms (along with its stone bull-verraco). It has been known traditionally as puente mayor and as puente prinçipal (main bridge) which gives access to the southern part of the city. The bridge as it currently appears is a result of several restorations. One of the disasters that most affected it was the Flood of San Policarpo on the night of January 26, 1626. It was declared Artistic Historic Monument on June 3, 1931, and Bien de Interés Cultural in 1998. Until the beginning of 20th century it carried the main road into the city, and continued to bear heavy traffic until 1973. Since the construction of a third bridge for road traffic it remains exclusive for pedestrians.

The bridge is actually a construction of two bridges separated by a central fortification: the old bridge which extends along the portion near the city is of Roman origin, and the new bridge. Of the twenty-six arches, only the first fifteen date from Roman times. The stone used in its construction differs in origin, while employed in Roman bridge area is originally from the granite quarries of Los Santos (Béjar), the stone used in the hispana part and more modern bridge, comes from the area of Ledesma. The bridge has been restored on numerous occasions and has survived several attempts at demolition. Many of the restorations have been poorly documented, leaving for the study of archaeologists a great part of the work of determination, dating and explaining the ancient construction techniques. The date of the construction of the bridge is not precisely known, but is among the mandates of the Emperors Augustus (27 B. C.-14 D. C.) and Vespasian (69-79), making it a bimillennium architectural monument.

History 
The history of the bridge is connected to the city and is part of its most characteristic monuments along with the two cathedrals, the La Clerecía, Plaza Mayor, Casa de las Conchas. Formerly, there was a popular belief that the bridge was first built by Heracles and later was rebuilt by the Roman Emperor Trajan. the basis for the theory that its builder was Trajan , reports Gil González Dávila in 1606, was a tombstone found at the time, but this actually refers to a repair of the Vía de la Plata. In 1767, a box was found in the first arcade and within it was a medal in honour Heracles; the Salamancan chronicler Bernardo Dorado realises this in his Compendio Histórico de la Ciudad de Salamanca. This reinforced the popular myth that has remained in popular sayings. Nevertheless, subsequent historical research mentions that the bridge was built in the second half of the 1st century. It was born from the need to provide a crossing of the Tormes River by travellers on the Vía de la Plata linking Mérida and Astorga (Iter ab Emerita Asturicam).

Origin
As early as the 13th century there was documented existence of the Verraco next to the bridge, and in 1606, the city's chronicler Gil González Dávila noted that the Salamanca's coat of arms had a stone bull in the first quartering. This coat of arms was used in the wax seals of council and clergy. Although the verraco date from the time of the Vettones, the construction of the bridge dates back to times of Roman rule over the area. The trajectory of the Iter ab Emerita Asturicam through Salamanca required the construction of a bridge near the city. Nevertheless, there is no documentary, epigraphic and archaeological evidence capable of accurately determining the precise timing of its construction.

Due to the constructive evolution of this stretch of Roman road (completed in all its sections in year 19 BC), it is possible that the bridge was built approximately during Nero's mandate. Other historians date it from the time of Trajan and Hadrian (the bridge's structure has similarities with the Aqueduct of Segovia). These conclusions are based on epigraphic studies made to milestones in the road since the bridges do not provide reliable information from the archaeological point of view.

The Vía de la Plata was completed in all sections in 19 BC. The descriptions made by Strabo (III, 4, 20) of the distribution of the Roman troops in Hispania, show that Roman deployment was enabled from Astorga, León to Lusitania.

When Augustus made his second campaign in Hispania between 16 and 13 B.C., newly populated places began to appear along the roads, especially those engaged in the ore transport. This led to the need to build elements of public works to facilitate communication and transport. During the Flavian dynasty's period there was great activity in the northern Spain reflected in increased construction activity. At beginning of the first century, exploitation of the Las Cavenes's gold mines (in El Cabaco) began. This suggests that the bridge was built during Trajan's rule, a time of great municipalization of population centres. It is possible that the bridge did not originally consist only of stone but of a mixed construction with wood.

After Roman times there are few data on the role of bridge in successive invasions of Suebis, Vandals and Alans, or during the lengthy Visigothic reign of Toledo.

Middle Ages to eighteenth century 
It is possible, or not, that the bridge has always been subjected to the flooding of the Tormes River. This suggests that the primitive Roman bridge could have been longer than the current structure, the Hispanic part being a medieval reconstruction after a strong flood. The bridge was key in communication with the Leonese kingdom during the Reconquista. Nevertheless, it is not until the 12th century that documentary information of the existence of the bridge appears. Control of people and goods (in addition to collection of the portazgo tax) was carried out on the near side of Salamanca. One of the first major floods occurred in 1256, called Ríada de los Difuntos. This flooding and its effects on the bridge are documented, and it seems, that it left  the southern part of the bridge impassable. It is unknown whether the new part of the bridge was built subsequent to this flood.

Since the late 15th century it has been known as the "puente prinçipal de la çiudad de Salamanca" (main bridge of the city of Salamanca) and suffered a flood of the Tomes River known as the "avenida de Santa Bárbara" (December 3, 1498). In the early-16th century, the Tormes was considered, like the Tagus, one of the most dangerous rivers in the Iberian Peninsula, due to its large floods. In 1570, the traveller and painter Anton van den Wyngaerde painted the bridge and city from the arrabal. In 1626, the Flood of San Policarpo occurred, causing much destruction to the city and to two of the bridge's medieval arches. Gradually the other arches collapsed up to the Central tower; the Roman section remained undamaged. In 1627, major repairs occurred, being Corregidor of Salamanca Diego de Pareja Velarde, as can be seen today in the two pillars of the entrance to the arrabal. The central tower and the battlements were removed.

Bridge after the Flood of San Policarpo 
The bridge's second repair occurred in 1767 to maintain the bridge its eleven modern and fifteen Roman arches.

On 22 July 1812, during the Peninsular War against the Napoleonic French, there was a battle south of the city (in the hills of Arapil Chico and Arapil Grande) called the Battle of Salamanca, known in Spanish as the Battle of the Arapiles (la batalla de los Arapiles). Due to its strategic position, the bridge became a military target. The day before the battle, the Duke of Wellington took the bridge and the fords of Santa Marta and Aldea Luenga, and from here could direct the attack against the French troops.

The bridge was portrayed by the romantic painter David Roberts in 1837, and also by Gustave Doré in 1862.

References

Salamanca
Bridges completed in the 1st century
Buildings and structures in Salamanca
Stone bridges in Spain
Pedestrian bridges in Spain
Bridges in Castile and León